Saraswathi Gora (28 September 1912 – 19 August 2006) was an Indian social activist who served as leader of the Atheist Centre for many years, campaigning against untouchability and the caste system.

Biography 
In the 1930s, Saraswathi championed and performed marriages of devadasis and of widows remarriages along with her husband Gora. After learning about their efforts to abolish untouchability and the caste system, and towards social reform, they were invited to Mahatma Gandhi's ashram in Sevagram in 1944, where they stayed for two weeks.

Along with her husband, Saraswathi established the Atheist Center in 1940. Their goal was to promote human values based on atheism, rationalism and Gandhism.

A political activist of India's freedom movement, she was imprisoned during the Quit India movement. She went to jail carrying her two-and-half-year old son, Niyanta.

Personal life 

Her autobiography My Life With Gora was published (in Telugu) in 2012. She died of lung infection on 19 August 2006 at Vijayawada.

Awards and recognition 

In 2000, she was selected for the Basava Puraskar, conferred by the Karnataka Government. She is also the recipient of the G. D. Birla International Award for Humanism; the Jamnalal Bajaj Award (1999); the Janaki Devi Bajaj Award; and the Potti Sriramulu Telugu University Award.

References

External links
 A short biography of Saraswathi Gora in Indian Skeptic by Sunanda Shet
 Obituary in Deccan Herald
 Obituary at www.newsfix.de

1912 births
2006 deaths
Indian atheists
Indian sceptics
Telugu women writers
Telugu writers
Indian women activists
People from Vijayawada
Indian independence activists from Andhra Pradesh
Prisoners and detainees of British India
Women in Andhra Pradesh politics
Social workers
Writers from Andhra Pradesh
21st-century Indian women writers
20th-century Indian educational theorists
20th-century Indian women scientists
20th-century Indian social scientists
Indian women educational theorists
Women writers from Andhra Pradesh
Women scientists from Andhra Pradesh
Activists from Andhra Pradesh
Women Indian independence activists
Indian human rights activists
Social workers from Andhra Pradesh
Women educators from Andhra Pradesh
Educators from Andhra Pradesh
Writers from Vijayawada
Scientists from Vijayawada
21st-century Indian biographers
Women autobiographers
Indian autobiographers
Indian women non-fiction writers
20th-century women writers
20th-century women educators